The 2018 Australian Open wildcard playoffs and entries are a group of events and internal selections to choose the eight men and eight women singles wildcard entries for the 2018 Australian Open, as well as seven male and seven female doubles teams plus eight mixed-doubles teams.

Wildcard entries

Men's singles

Women's singles

Men's doubles

Women's doubles

Mixed doubles

US Wildcard Challenge
The USTA awarded a wildcard to the man and woman that earned the most ranking points across a group of three ATP/Challenger hardcourt events in the October and November 2017. For the men, the events included ATP Paris, $75K Canberra, $75K Charlottesville, $75K+H Shenzhen, €106K+H Bratislava, €85K+H Mouilleron-le-Captif, $50K+H Kobe, $75K Knoxville, $75K Champaign and $50K+H Pune events. For the women, the events included $80K Macon, $80K Tyler and $80K Waco. Only the best two results from the three weeks of challengers were taken into account with the winners being Tim Smyczek and Taylor Townsend.

Men's standings

Women's standings

Australian Women's Wildcard Challenge
Tennis Australia awarded a singles wildcard and a doubles wildcard to the Australian women that earned the most ranking points across a group of two ITF hardcourt events in the October and November 2017. The events included the 2017 Canberra Tennis International and the 2017 Bendigo Women's International. The winners of the wildcards were Olivia Rogowska, and Alison Bai and Zoe Hives, respectively.

Singles standings

Doubles standings

Asia-Pacific Wildcard Playoff
The Asia-Pacific Australian Open Wildcard Play-off featured 16-players in the men's and women's singles draws and took place from 29 November to 3 December 2017 at Hengqin International Tennis Centre in Zhuhai, China.

Men's singles

Seeds

Draw

Women's singles

Seeds

Draw

Men's doubles

Seeds

Draw

Women's doubles

Seeds

Draw

Australian Wildcard Playoff
The December Showdown is held annually for two weeks in December. The Showdown includes age championships for 12/u, 14/u, 16/u and 18/u age categories. It also hosts the 2018 Australian Wildcard Playoff which will be held from 11–17 December 2017 at Melbourne Park, offering a main draw singles wildcard for men and women and a main draw women's doubles wildcard. The winner of the girls' 18/u championship will also be given a main draw wildcard into the 2018 Australian Open.

Men's singles

Seeds

Draw

Women's singles

Seeds

Draw

Women's doubles

Seeds

Draw

Girls' singles

Seeds

Draw

Notes

References

External links
 Asia/Pacific Wildcard Playoff
 Australian Wildcard Playoff
 USTA Wildcard Challenge